Germán Jordán is a province in the Cochabamba Department, Bolivia. Its capital is Cliza. Many people from Germán Jordán province, along with people from neighboring Esteban Arze and Punata province have migrated to Argentina and to the Washington, D.C. area.

Subdivision 
Germán Jordán Province is divided into three municipalities which are further subdivided into cantons.

External links 
 Map of Germán Jordán Province

Provinces of Cochabamba Department